Two major families of Mac operating systems were developed by Apple Inc.

In 1984, Apple debuted the operating system that is now known as the "Classic" Mac OS with its release of the original Macintosh System Software. The system, rebranded "Mac OS" in 1997, was pre-installed on every Macintosh until 2002 and offered on Macintosh clones for a short time in the 1990s. Noted for its ease of use, it was also criticized for its lack of modern technologies compared to its competitors.

The current Mac operating system is macOS, originally named "Mac OS X" until 2012 and then "OS X" until 2016. Developed between 1997 and 2001 after Apple's purchase of NeXT, Mac OS X brought an entirely new architecture based on NeXTSTEP, a Unix system, that eliminated many of the technical challenges that the classic Mac OS faced. The current macOS is pre-installed with every Mac and receives a major update annually. It is the basis of Apple's current system software for its other devices – iOS, iPadOS, watchOS, and tvOS.

Prior to the introduction of Mac OS X, Apple experimented with several other concepts, releasing different products designed to bring the Macintosh interface or applications to Unix-like systems or vice versa, A/UX, MAE, and MkLinux. Apple's effort to expand upon and develop a replacement for its classic Mac OS in the 1990s led to a few cancelled projects, code named Star Trek, Taligent, and Copland.

Although they have different architectures, Mac operating systems share a common set of GUI principles, including a menu bar across the top of the screen; the Finder shell, featuring a desktop metaphor that represents files and applications using icons and relates concepts like directories and file deletion to real-world objects like folders and a trash can; and overlapping windows for multitasking.

Classic Mac OS 

The "classic" Mac OS is the original Macintosh operating system that was introduced in 1984 alongside the first Macintosh and remained in primary use on Macs until the introduction of Mac OS X in 2001.

Apple released the original Macintosh on January 24, 1984; its early system software was partially based on the Lisa OS and the Xerox PARC Alto computer, which former Apple CEO Steve Jobs previewed. It was originally named "System Software", or simply "System"; Apple rebranded it as "Mac OS" in 1996 due in part to its Macintosh clone program that ended a year later.

Classic Mac OS is characterized by its monolithic design. Initial versions of the System Software run one application at a time. System 5 introduced cooperative multitasking. System 7 supports 32-bit memory addressing and virtual memory, allowing larger programs. Later updates to the System 7 enable the transition to the PowerPC architecture. The system was considered user-friendly, but its architectural limitations were critiqued, such as limited memory management, lack of protected memory and access controls, and susceptibility to conflicts among extensions.

Releases 

Nine major versions of the classic Mac OS were released. The name "Classic" that now signifies the system as a whole is a reference to a compatibility layer that helped ease the transition to Mac OS X.
 Macintosh System Software – "System 1", released in 1984
 System Software 2, 3, and 4 – released between 1985 and 1987
 System Software 5 – released in 1987
 System Software 6 – released in 1988
 System 7 / Mac OS 7.6 – released in 1991
 Mac OS 8 – released in 1997
 Mac OS 9 – final major version, released in 1999

Mac OS X / OS X / macOS 

macOS (originally named "Mac OS X" until 2012 and then "OS X" until 2016) is the current Mac operating system that officially succeeded the classic Mac OS in 2001.

Although the system was originally marketed as simply "version 10" of Mac OS, it has a history that is largely independent of the classic Mac OS. It is a Unix-based operating system built on NeXTSTEP and other technology developed at NeXT from the late 1980s until early 1997, when Apple purchased the company and its CEO Steve Jobs returned to Apple. Precursors to the original release of Mac OS X include OPENSTEP, Apple's Rhapsody project, and the Mac OS X Public Beta.

macOS makes use of the BSD codebase and the XNU kernel, and its core set of components is based upon Apple's open source Darwin operating system.

macOS is the basis for some of Apple's other operating systems, including iPhone OS/iOS, iPadOS, watchOS, and tvOS.

Releases

Desktop 
The first desktop version of the system was released on March 24, 2001, supporting the Aqua user interface. Since then, several more versions adding newer features and technologies have been released. Since 2011, new releases have been offered on an yearly basis.
 Mac OS X 10.0 – code named "Cheetah", released to end users on Saturday, March 24, 2001
 Mac OS X 10.1 – code named "Puma", released to end users on Tuesday, September 25, 2001
 Mac OS X Jaguar – version 10.2, released to end users on Friday, August 23, 2002
 Mac OS X Panther – version 10.3, released to end users on Friday, October 24, 2003
 Mac OS X Tiger – version 10.4, released to end users on Friday, April 29, 2005
 Mac OS X Leopard – version 10.5, released to end users on Friday, October 26, 2007
 Mac OS X Snow Leopard – version 10.6, publicly unveiled on Monday, June 8, 2009
 Mac OS X Lion – version 10.7, released to end users on Wednesday, July 20, 2011
 OS X Mountain Lion – version 10.8, released to end users on Wednesday, July 25, 2012
 OS X Mavericks – version 10.9, released to end users on Tuesday, October 22, 2013
 OS X Yosemite – version 10.10, released to end users on Thursday, October 16, 2014
 OS X El Capitan – version 10.11, released to end users on Wednesday, September 30, 2015
 macOS Sierra – version 10.12, released to end users on Tuesday, September 20, 2016
 macOS High Sierra – version 10.13, released to end users on Monday, September 25, 2017
 macOS Mojave – version 10.14, released to end users on Monday, September 24, 2018
 macOS Catalina – version 10.15, released to end users on Monday, October 7, 2019
 macOS Big Sur – version 11, released to end users on Thursday, November 12, 2020
 macOS Monterey – version 12, released to end users on Monday, October 25, 2021
 macOS Ventura – version 13, released to end users on Monday, October 24, 2022

Server 
An early server computing version of the system was released in 1999 as a technology preview. It was followed by several more official server-based releases. Server functionality has instead been offered as an add-on for the desktop system since 2011.
 Mac OS X Server 1.0 – code named "Hera", released in 1999
 Mac OS X Server – later called "OS X Server" and "macOS Server", released between 2001 and 2022.

Other projects

Shipped

A/ROSE

The Apple Real-time Operating System Environment (A/ROSE) was a small embedded operating system which ran on the Macintosh Coprocessor Platform, an expansion card for the Macintosh. The idea was to offer a single "overdesigned" hardware platform on which third-party vendors could build practically any product, reducing the otherwise heavy workload of developing a NuBus-based expansion card. The first version of the system was ready for use in February 1988.

A/UX

In 1988, Apple released its first UNIX-based OS, A/UX, which was a UNIX operating system with the Mac OS look and feel. It was not very competitive for its time, due in part to the crowded UNIX market and Macintosh hardware lacking high-end design features present on workstation-class computers. A/UX had most of its success in sales to the U.S. government, where POSIX compliance was a requirement that Mac OS could not meet.

MAE

The Macintosh Application Environment (MAE) was a software package introduced by Apple in 1994 that allowed users of certain Unix-based computer workstations to run Apple Macintosh application software. MAE used the X Window System to emulate a Macintosh Finder-style graphical user interface. The last version, MAE 3.0, was compatible with System 7.5.3. MAE was available for Sun Microsystems SPARCstation and Hewlett-Packard systems. It was discontinued on May 14, 1998.

MkLinux

Announced at the 1996 Worldwide Developers Conference (WWDC), MkLinux is an open source operating system that was started by the OSF Research Institute and Apple in February 1996 to port Linux to the PowerPC platform, and thus Macintosh computers. In mid 1998, the community-led MkLinux Developers Association took over development of the operating system. MkLinux is short for "Microkernel Linux," which refers to the project's adaptation of the Linux kernel to run as a server hosted atop the Mach microkernel. MkLinux is based on version 3.0 of Mach.

Cancelled projects

Star Trek

Star Trek (as in "to boldly go where no Mac has gone before") was a relatively unknown secret prototype beginning in 1992, whose goal was to create a version of the classic Mac OS that would run on Intel-compatible x86 personal computers. In partnership with Apple and with support from Intel, the project was instigated by Novell, which was looking to integrate its DR-DOS with the Mac OS GUI as a mutual response to the monopoly of Microsoft's Windows 3.0 and MS-DOS. A team consisting of four from Apple and four from Novell was able to get the Macintosh Finder and some basic applications such as QuickTime, running smoothly on the x86 architecture. The project was canceled a year later in early 1993, but some of the code was later reused when porting the Mac OS to PowerPC.

Taligent

Taligent (a portmanteau of "talent" and "intelligent") was the name of an object-oriented operating system and the company dedicated to producing it. Started as a project within Apple to provide a replacement for the classic Mac OS, it was later spun off into a joint venture with IBM as part of the AIM alliance, with the purpose of building a competing platform to Microsoft Cairo and NeXTSTEP. The development process never worked, and Taligent is often cited as an example of a project death march. Apple pulled out of the project in 1995 before the code had been delivered.

Copland

Copland was a project at Apple to create an updated version of the classic Mac OS. It was to have introduced protected memory, preemptive multitasking and a number of new underlying operating system features, yet still be compatible with existing Mac software. As originally planned, a follow-up release known as "Gershwin" would add multithreading and other advanced features. New features were added more rapidly than they could be completed, and the completion date slipped into the future with no sign of a release. In 1996, Apple decided to cancel the project outright and find a suitable third-party system to replace it. Copland development ended in August 1996, and in December 1996, Apple announced that it was buying NeXT for its NeXTSTEP operating system.

Timeline

Related systems 

Before the arrival of the Macintosh in 1984, Apple's history of operating systems began with its Apple II series computers in 1977, which ran Apple DOS, ProDOS, and later GS/OS; the Apple III in 1980, which ran Apple SOS; and the Apple Lisa in 1983, which ran Lisa OS and later MacWorks XL, a Macintosh emulator. Apple also developed the Newton OS for its Newton personal digital assistant from 1993 to 1997.

In recent years, Apple has also launched several new operating systems based on the core of macOS, including iOS in 2007 for its iPhone, iPad, and iPod Touch mobile devices and in 2017 for its HomePod smart speakers; watchOS in 2015 for the Apple Watch; tvOS in 2015 for the Apple TV set-top box.

See also
 Comparison of operating systems
 History of the graphical user interface
 Mac
 List of Mac software

References

External links

 
Apple Inc. software
History of software
Lists of operating systems
Macintosh operating systems development
Operating system families
Software version histories